The Vinča culture, also known as Turdaș culture, Turdaș–Vinča culture or Vinča-Turdaș culture, is a Neolithic archaeological culture of Southeast Europe, dated to the period 5700–4500 BC or 5300–4700/4500 BC. Named for its type site, Vinča-Belo Brdo, a large tell settlement discovered by Serbian archaeologist Miloje Vasić in 1908, it represents the material remains of a prehistoric society mainly distinguished by its settlement pattern and ritual behaviour.

Farming technology first introduced to the region during the First Temperate Neolithic was developed further by the Vinča culture, fuelling a population boom and producing some of the largest settlements in prehistoric Europe. These settlements maintained a high degree of cultural uniformity through the long-distance exchange of ritual items, but were probably not politically unified. Various styles of zoomorphic and anthropomorphic figurines are hallmarks of the culture, as are the Vinča symbols, which some conjecture to be the earliest form of proto-writing. Although not conventionally considered part of the Chalcolithic or "Copper Age", the Vinča culture provides the earliest known example of copper smelting in the Old World.

Geography and demographics

The Vinča culture occupied a region of southeastern Europe (i.e. the Balkans) corresponding mainly to modern-day Serbia and Kosovo, but also parts of Romania, Bulgaria, Bosnia, Montenegro, North Macedonia, and Greece.

This region had already been settled by farming societies of the First Temperate Neolithic, but during the Vinča period sustained population growth led to an unprecedented level of settlement size and density along with the population of areas that were bypassed by earlier settlers.  Vinča settlements were considerably larger than any other contemporary European culture, in some instances surpassing the cities of the Aegean and early Near Eastern Bronze Age a millennium later. One of the largest sites was Vinča-Belo Brdo (a suburb of Belgrade, Serbia), it covered  and had up to 2,500 people.

Early Vinča settlement population density was 50–200 people per hectare, in later phases an average of 50–100 people per hectare was common. The Divostin site was occupied twice between 4900 and 4650 B.C. and an estimate based on 17 houses suggests that given a lifespan per house of 56 years. 1028 houses were built on the site during that period with a final population size estimated to be between 868 and 2864. Another large site was Crkvine-Stubline from 4850/4800 BC. it may have contained a maximum population of 4,000. The settlement of Parţa maybe had 1,575 people living there at the same time.

Chronology

The origins of the Vinča culture are debated. Before the advent of radiocarbon dating it was thought, on the basis of typological similarities, that Vinča and other Neolithic cultures belonging to the 'Dark Burnished Ware' complex were the product of migrations from Anatolia to the Balkans. This had to be reassessed in light of radiocarbon dates which showed that the Dark Burnished Ware complex appeared at least a millennium before Troy I, the putative starting point of the westward migration. An alternative hypothesis where the Vinča culture developed locally from the preceding Starčevo culture—first proposed by Colin Renfrew in 1969—is now accepted by many scholars, but the evidence is not conclusive.

The Vinča culture can be divided into two phases, closely linked with those of its type site Vinča-Belo Brdo:

Decline
In its later phase the centre of the Vinča network shifted from Vinča-Belo Brdo to Vršac, and the long-distance exchange of obsidian and Spondylus artefacts from modern-day Hungary and the Aegean respectively became more important than that of Vinča figurines. Eventually the network lost its cohesion altogether and fell into decline. It is likely that, after two millennia of intensive farming, economic stresses caused by decreasing soil fertility were partly responsible for this decline.

According to Marija Gimbutas, the Vinča culture was part of Old Europe – a relatively homogeneous, peaceful and matrifocal culture that occupied Europe during the Neolithic. According to this hypothesis its period of decline was followed by an invasion of warlike, horse-riding Proto-Indo-European tribes from the Pontic–Caspian steppe.

Economy

Subsistence
Most people in Vinča settlements would have been occupied with the provision of food. They practised a mixed subsistence economy where agriculture, animal husbandry and hunting and foraging all contributed to the diet of the growing Vinča population. Compared to earlier cultures of the First Temperate Neolithic (FTN) these practices were intensified, with increasing specialisation on high-yield cereal crops and the secondary products of domesticated animals, consistent with the increased population density.

Vinča agriculture introduced common wheat, oat and flax to temperate Europe, and made greater use of barley than the cultures of the FTN. These innovations increased crop yields and allowed the manufacture of clothes made from plant textiles as well as animal products (i.e. leather and wool). There is indirect evidence that Vinča farmers made use of the cattle-driven plough, which would have had a major effect on the amount of human labour required for agriculture as well as opening up new area of land for farming. Many of the largest Vinča sites occupy regions dominated by soil types that would have required ploughing.

Areas with less arable potential were exploited through transhumant pastoralism, where groups from the lowland villages moved their livestock to nearby upland areas on a seasonal basis. Cattle were more important than sheep and goats in Vinča herds and, in comparison to the cultures of the FTN, livestock was increasingly kept for milk, leather and as draft animals, rather than solely for meat. Seasonal movement to upland areas was also motivated by the exploitation of stone and mineral resources. Where these were especially rich permanent upland settlements were established, which would have relied more heavily on pastoralism for subsistence.

Although increasingly focused on domesticated plants and animals, the Vinča subsistence economy still made use of wild food resources. The hunting of deer, boar and aurochs, fishing of carp and catfish, shell-collecting, fowling and foraging of wild cereals, forest fruits and nuts made up a significant part of the diet at some Vinča sites. These, however, were in the minority; settlements were invariably located with agricultural rather than wild food potential in mind, and wild resources were usually underexploited unless the area was low in arable productivity.

Industry

Generally speaking craft production within the Vinča network was carried out at the household level; there is little evidence for individual economic specialisation. Nevertheless, some Vinča artefacts were made with considerable levels of technical skill. A two-stage method was used to produce pottery with a polished, multi-coloured finish, known as 'Black-topped' and 'Rainbow Ware'. Sometimes powdered cinnabar and limonite were applied to the fired clay for decoration. The style of Vinča clothing can be inferred from figurines depicted with open-necked tunics and decorated skirts. Cloth was woven from both flax and wool (with flax becoming more important in the later Vinča period), and buttons made from shell or stone were also used.

The Vinča site of Pločnik has produced the earliest example of copper tools in the world. However, the people of the Vinča network practised only an early and limited form of metallurgy. Copper ores were mined on a large scale at sites like Rudna Glava, but only a fraction were smelted and cast into metal artefacts – and these were ornaments and trinkets rather than functional tools, which continued to be made from chipped stone, bone and antler. It is likely that the primary use of mined ores was in their powdered form, in the production of pottery or as bodily decoration.

Major Vinča sites

 Belogradchik
 Crkvine
 Drenovac
 Gomolava
 Gornja Tuzla
 Pločnik
 Rudna Glava
 Selevac
 Tărtăria
 Turdaş
 Vinča-Belo Brdo, the type site
 Vratsa
 Vršac

Gallery

See also

 Tărtăria tablets
Old Europe
Sesklo culture
Varna culture
Hamangia culture
Cucuteni–Trypillia culture
Linear Pottery culture

Notes

References

Citations

Bibliography

Further reading

External links

 The Lost World of Old Europe: The Danube Valley 5000-3500 BC, Exhibition Video (2010)

 
Prehistory of Southeastern Europe
Neolithic cultures of Europe
Archaeological cultures in Bulgaria
Archaeological cultures in Greece
Archaeological cultures in Kosovo
Archaeological cultures in North Macedonia
Archaeological cultures in Montenegro
Archaeological cultures in Romania
Archaeological cultures in Serbia
Neolithic Serbia
5th millennium BC
4th millennium BC
Pre-Indo-Europeans
6th-millennium BC establishments
3rd-millennium BC disestablishments